Chourai Assembly constituency is one of the 230 Vidhan Sabha (Legislative Assembly) constituencies of Madhya Pradesh state in central India.

It is part of Chhindwara District.

Members of Legislative Assembly

See also
 Chhindwara (Lok Sabha constituency)
 Chaurai Khas

References

Assembly constituencies of Madhya Pradesh